Jordan Keith Tandy (born February 12, 1989) is a former American football safety and coach who is currently coaching with the Tampa Bay Buccaneers. He was selected by the Tampa Bay Buccaneers in the sixth round of the 2012 NFL Draft. He played college football at West Virginia.

High school career
Tandy attended Christian County High School in Hopkinsville, Kentucky. While there he played quarterback. For his career, he passed for 8,609 yards and 90 touchdowns. As a senior, he rushed for 1,007 yards and intercepted four passes on defense.

College career
Tandy then attended West Virginia University (WVU) where he majored in forensic and investigative sciences.

He redshirt his freshman year. In 2008, as a redshirt freshman, he appeared in six games, recording six tackles (four solo). In 2009 as a redshirt sophomore, he started all 13 games, recording 61 tackles (43 solo), four tackles-for-loss and three interceptions. His interceptions tied for 10th in the Big East with three interceptions and 14th with seven passes defensed.

In 2010 as a redshirt junior, he started all 13 games, recording 57 tackles (38 solo), two tackles-for-loss, six interceptions, 11 passes defensed and one forced fumble. For the season, he was finished 10th in the nation in interceptions, and first in the Big East. He was also named Second-team All-American by SI.com and Third-team All-American by Rivals.com. As a redshirt senior in 2011, he started all 13 games, recording 64 tackles (50 solo), two tackles-for-loss, four interceptions and nine passes defensed. His four interceptions led the team and ranked third in the Big East. While at West Virginia he was also a three-time Big East academic All-Star.

Career statistics

Professional career

Tampa Bay Buccaneers
Tandy was selected in the sixth round (174th overall) in the 2012 NFL draft by the Tampa Bay Buccaneers. On May 10, 2012, he signed his four-year rookie contract.

As a rookie in 2012, Tandy appeared in nine games. He recorded three tackles. In 2013, he appeared in all 16 games, starting five. He recorded 40 tackles (31 solo), three passes defensed, three interceptions, one forced fumble and one fumble recovery. In 2014, he appeared in 15 games. He recorded eight tackles, one pass defensed and one interception. In 2015, he appeared in 14 games with two starts. He recorded 42 tackles (28 solo), one sack and one pass defensed.

On March 8, 2016, Tandy re-signed with the Buccaneers. In his first start of the season in Week 13 against the Chargers, Tandy picked off Philip Rivers in the end zone with 2:50 left on the clock to seal the Buccaneers' 28-21 win. The following week against the Saints, Tandy once again had a game-winning interception on fourth down with less than a minute on a clock to seal the Buccaneers' 16-11 win.

On March 14, 2018, Tandy signed a two-year contract extension with the Buccaneers.

On September 1, 2018, Tandy was released by the Buccaneers.

Atlanta Falcons
On September 10, 2018, Tandy was signed by the Atlanta Falcons. He was waived on December 4, 2018.

Career statistics

Coaching career
In 2019, Tandy coached high school football at Bishop McLaughlin Catholic High School in Pasco County, Florida before returning to the Tampa Bay Buccaneers in 2020 as an assistant special teams coach. He helped win Super Bowl 55 with the Buccaneers against the Kansas City Chiefs in the 2020-21 season.

Personal life
Tandy is the son of Joyce Jordan. While playing for the Buccaneers, he has helped numerous charities as well as helped support the United States Armed Forces troops. While at West Virginia, he was roommates with teammate and fellow future Tampa Bay Buccaneers 2012 draft pick Najee Goode.

References

External links
 
 Tampa Bay Buccaneers bio
 West Virginia Mountaineers bio

1989 births
Living people
American football cornerbacks
Atlanta Falcons players
Players of American football from Kentucky
Sportspeople from Hopkinsville, Kentucky
Tampa Bay Buccaneers players
West Virginia Mountaineers football players
Tampa Bay Buccaneers coaches